William Philip Burns (19 August 1884 – 17 June 1955) was an Australian rules footballer who played for Geelong and Richmond in the Victorian Football League (VFL).

Bill 'Boots' Burns played with Ararat Football Club 1904–05, 10 games, 1904 Premiership

Burns, from South Bendigo originally, started out at Geelong and in 1908 became a member of Richmond's inaugural VFL team. A follower, he went from hero to villain during the 1909 VFL season after kicking the winning goal in one game and then getting a life ban for a kicking incident later in the year.

His goal came in Richmond's round two encounter against University, after he had received a bump which gave him bad concussion. He was in the dressing room at three quarter time, preparing to go to hospital, but decided to return to the field as the scores were close.

Against Melbourne at the MCG mid-season, Burns was reported for kicking an opponent and suspended for life by the VFL tribunal. Despite the ban, Burns had made three appearances for West Perth in the 1910 West Australian Football League season. He returned to Richmond in 1912 once his suspension had been lifted, having missed 46 games.

Once he left Richmond for good, he played at WAFL club East Fremantle and was a half forward flanker in their 1914 premiership side. He was a premiership player again in 1918 and also appeared in losing Grand Finals over the next few years, mostly as a wingman. Burns then retired, having played 104 senior games for East Fremantle. He was a Western Australian interstate representative at the 1914 Sydney Carnival.

References

Holmesby, Russell and Main, Jim (2007). The Encyclopedia of AFL Footballers. 7th ed. Melbourne: Bas Publishing.

External links

1884 births
1955 deaths
Australian rules footballers from Ballarat
Geelong Football Club players
Richmond Football Club players
East Fremantle Football Club players
West Perth Football Club players
South Bendigo Football Club players